Double Canfield is a solitaire game using two decks of playing cards.  The object of the game is to move all of the cards to the Foundations.

Rules

Layout

Double Canfield has eight Foundations that build up in suit from rank of first card dealt, e.g. Q♣, K♣, A♣, 2♣...

There are five Tableau Stacks of one card each that build down in opposite colors, e.g. 2♥, A♥, K♥, Q♥...

The Reserve Pile contains thirteen cards that can be played onto the Tableaus or the Foundations.

Gameplay
Empty spaces in the Tableau are automatically filled with the cards from the Reserve Pile.  If the Reserve Pile is empty, then the spaces may be filled by any card.  Unlimited passes are allowed through the deck.

References

See also
 Canfield
 List of solitaires
 Glossary of solitaire

Mobile games
Double-deck patience card games